Rise Above is an album by indie rock band Dirty Projectors, released on September 11, 2007. The album was band leader David Longstreth's reinterpretation of Black Flag album Damaged from memory having not heard it in 15 years. The album features Longstreth on guitar and vocals, Amber Coffman on vocals and guitar, Brian McOmber on drums, Nat Baldwin on bass, and Susanna Waiche on vocals. Angel Deradoorian would join the band shortly before the Rise Above tour on bass and vocals. This album is the first that presents Dirty Projectors as a fully realized band rather than an individual project of Longstreth.

Reception

The record was generally well received by critics, maintaining a 78% positive rating at Metacritic. The album received particularly high ratings from The A.V. Club and Pitchfork. AllMusic called the album "a brave and ultimately successful experiment."

Track listing
"What I See" - 3:27
"No More" - 3:48
"Depression" - 2:48
"Six Pack" - 3:05
"Thirsty and Miserable" - 5:55
"Police Story" - 4:23
"Gimmie Gimmie Gimmie" - 4:50
"Spray Paint (The Walls)" - 3:38
"Room 13" - 4:47
"Rise Above" - 5:03
Untitled (bonus track) - 1:14

Vinyl edition
Side one
"What I See" - 3:27
"No More" - 3:48
"Depression" - 2:48
"Six Pack" - 3:05
"Thirsty and Miserable" - 5:55
Untitled (bonus track) - 1:14

Side two
"Police Story" - 4:23
"Gimmie Gimmie Gimmie" - 4:50
"Spray Paint (The Walls)" - 3:38
"Room 13" - 4:47
"Rise Above" - 5:03

References

External links
 Release information from the Dead Oceans website (including link to the MP3 of No More).
 Interview with David Longstreth from the Daytrotter website, published May 7, 2007.
 Interview with David Longstreth from the Line-out section of The Stranger, published February 23, 2007.

2007 albums
Dirty Projectors albums
Albums produced by Chris Taylor (Grizzly Bear musician)
Dead Oceans albums
Albums produced by David Longstreth